Peatsaí Ó Callanáin (1791-1865) was an Irish poet.

Younger brother of Marcas Ó Callanáin, Peatsaí is said to have been the better known of the two. He attended a local school in Craughwell, and later attended one or both the schools of Anthony O'Brien at Athenry, or of the (Dominican) Brothers at Esker.

He was for a time a rival of Antoine Ó Raifteiri but they later became good friends.

In 1967, Seán Ó Ceallaigh - principal of Craughwell National School - produced an edition of their poems.

References

 Filíocht na gCeannanáin, Seán Ó Ceallaigh, Baile Átha Cliath, An Clóchomhar, 1967.

People from County Galway
Irish poets
1865 deaths
1791 births
19th-century Irish poets
Irish-language writers